William Alexander Adam (October 21, 1917 – November 25, 2013) was an American trumpeter, respected pedagogue, and Professor Emeritus at Indiana University. He was highly analytical as a teacher, but always avoided discussing the mechanical aspects of trumpet playing with a student. Instead he "taught" by demonstration and by explanation in terms of sound. In his own words, "If your mind leaves the sound of the horn, obstacles will appear."

He gave many lectures throughout his life, but never wrote a book or article on his unconventional approach to trumpet.  He believed such a medium was against the very nature of his teaching of trumpet.  The only official documentation of his approach in a three-videotape series, A New and Different Way of Getting More Music out of Trumpet.  His approach is carried on by his former students, many of whom hold positions at music schools throughout the U.S. and around the world.

He died on November 25, 2013 in Bloomington, Indiana.

Notable former students 
 Chris Botti
 Randy Brecker
 Jerry Hey
 Miroslav Bukovsky
 John Rommel
 Gregory Wing

See also 
 20th century brass instrumentalists
 List of trumpeters

References 

 William A. Adam (subject), John Harbaugh (host), Stewart Aull (camera), A New and Different Way of Getting More Music out of Trumpet, Fairbanks, Alaska: Stewart Aull/Moving Images (1997) (Videocassette), 3 tapes

External links 
Tribute to Master Trumpet Teacher Bill Adam
Presentation of 2004 ITG Award of Merit and summary of lecture
Bill Adam forum Discussion of the Bill Adam approach at trumpetherald.com

1917 births
2013 deaths
American trumpeters
American male trumpeters